Eich is a German surname. Notable people with the surname include:

Brendan Eich (born 1961), American computer programmer
Günter Eich (1907–1972), German author
Hans Eich (born 1949), West German sprint canoeist
Marina Anna Eich (born 1976), German actress
Peter Eich (born 1963), German footballer
Walter Eich (born 1925), Swiss footballer
William Eich, American judge

See also
 Icke

German-language surnames